The Southeast Indian Ridge (SEIR) is a mid-ocean ridge in the southern Indian Ocean.  A divergent tectonic plate boundary stretching almost  between the Rodrigues Triple Junction in the Indian Ocean and the Macquarie Triple Junction in the Pacific Ocean, the SEIR forms the plate boundary between the Australian and Antarctic plates since the Oligocene (anomaly 13).

The SEIR is the spreading centre closest to the Kerguelen and Amsterdam–Saint-Paul hotspot.
The SEIR has an intermediate full spreading rate of 65 mm/yr, and, because Antarctica is virtually stationary, this results in a northward ridge migration of half that rate.
Spreading rates along the SEIR varies from 69 mm/yr near 88°E to 75 mm/yr near 120°E.

Geology

Amsterdam−St. Paul hotspot
During the past 1 Ma the Amsterdam–St. Paul hotspot (ASP) has produced a 150×200 km plateau straddling on the SEIR.  The ASP Plateau covers and area of 30,000 km2 and rises 500 m above the surrounding seafloor.

Both Amsterdam and St. Paul are located on the Antarctic side within 40 km of the SEIR.  North-east of the ASP Plateau a string of submarine volcanoes, 1−3 km-high and 40 km-wide, mark the track of the ASP hotspot across the Australian Plate.  This track leads to the intersection of the Broken Ridge and Ninety East Ridge west of Australia.  The ASP hotspot ceased to produce these volcanoes some 10−5 Ma when the SEIR started to interact with it and the hotspot started to build the shallow plateau.  The Kerguelen hotspot, located more than 1,000 km from the SEIR, also influences the MORB composition of the SEIR near the ASP Plateau.
Furthermore, there is an active submarine volcano, the 1100 m-high Boomerang Seamount, 18 km north of Amsterdam Island near the SEIR.  Analyses of the isotope composition of basalts recovered from its caldera support that the ASP hotspot contributed to the formation of the Ninety East Ridge.

Australian−Antarctic Discordance
Trending east-west between Australia and Antarctica, the SEIR traverses the Australian-Antarctic Discordance (AAD), a morphologically complex region overlying an area of mantle down-welling.  Located midway between the ASP-Kerguelen and the Balleny-Tasmantid hotspots, the AAD overlies a region where cooler mantle temperatures have produced a thin oceanic crust and a rough topography with deep valleys.

Between the AAD and the Amsterdam and St. Paul islands, spreading rate is constant at 69–75 mm/yr while axial depth increases by more than 2300 m.  This has been interpreted as an eastward decrease in mantle temperature of perhaps 100 °C caused by a magma flow from the Kerguelen–ASP hotspots to the AAD 'cold spot' at 120–128°E.  Located at 126°E, the AAD would thus mark the 40 km-long transition between Indian Ocean and Pacific MORBs (mid-ocean ridge basalts), a boundary that has been migrating westward during the past tens of million years.

Between 102°E and the AAD, where the spreading rate is constant, the left-stepping transform faults suggest the presence of oblique extensional forces while the presence of a long, elevated ridge near the 96°E right-stepping transform suggests a compressional force is also active.  Together these features indicate the two tectonic plate made a recent counter-clockwise change in relative motion.

Between 88°E and 118°E there are nine transform faults offsetting the SEIR 21–135 km or an age of 0.5–3.6 Ma, accompanied by eight first-order segments (older than 5 Ma) and five east-migrating rifts.  These transform faults and migrating rifts are located were the SEIR reaches its maximum axial depths.  The first-order transform faults are off-set 2–17 km by 19 non-transform discontinuities, resulting in 18–180 km-long second-order segments.  The flanks of the SEIR are dominated by fracture zones perpendicular to the ridge and gravitational lineations oblique to the spreading direction and sometimes zigzag-shaped.  This suggests that the SEIR evolves rapidly within the framework of the stable transform faults.

Tectonic history
Australia and Antarctica were neighbours before the break-up of Gondwana in the Cretaceous and several conjugate structures exist on either side of the SEIR.  In south-western Australia the Albany-Fraser Orogen formed during the Mesoproterozoic collision between the Australian Yilgarn and Antarctic Mawson cratons.  The continental basement of the submarine Naturaliste Plateau is also associated with this orogeny.  The Darling Fault on the Australian west coast has a possible continuation beneath the Antarctic Denman Glacier.  Archaean and Paleoproterzoic rocks in the Kalinjala Mylonite Zone of the Eyre Peninsula, Australia, match those found in Terre Adelie in Eastern Wilkes Land, Antarctica.  Faults in Tasmania–Victoria and Northern Victoria Land have been identified as Cambrian remains of the west-dipping subduction zone along the eastern margin of Gondwana.

Australia and Antarctica broke-up around 110 Ma but spreading in the SEIR first began during the Eocene (40 Ma) when the Kerguelen hotspot separated Broken Ridge from the rest of the Kerguelen Plateau.  The SEIR has been migrating northeast since and is now located 1400 km from the Kerguelen hotspot.  The ASP hotspot was originally located beneath Australia and a chain of seamounts connecting it to the southern end of the Ninety East Ridge, i.e. the ASP hotspot track, indicate it probably contributed to the formation of the Ninety East Ridge before the SEIR opened.

The opening of the Southern Ocean began west of Australia around 100 Ma from where it propagated eastward at about 2 cm/yr.  This rifting was not the direct product of hotspot interaction as it occurred over a cooler than normal mantle.  Initially spreading was extremely slow, a half rate of 2–6 mm/yr during the period 96–45 Ma after which it accelerated to 30–35 mm/yr.

Oceanography
The SEIR divides the channel between Australia and Antarctica into the South Indian Basin to the south and the South Australian and Tasman basins to the north.  The AAD forms a saddle across the channel while also offering the deepest connection between the Australian and South Indian basins.

There is a voluminous contourite drift along the southern flank of SEIR.  Volcanic in origin, it is most likely derived from the slopes of the Kerguelen Plateau and Crozet Islands.  This redistribution of sediments has occurred during the last 40000 years.  Elevated contributions during the Last Glacial Maximum are thought to be caused by the Antarctic Circumpolar Current and Circumpolar Deep Water and their interaction with the Circumpolar Bottom Water.

See also 

 Central Indian Ridge
 Southwest Indian Ridge
 Rodrigues Triple Junction

Notes

References

 
 
 
 
 
 
 
 
 
 
 

Underwater ridges of the Indian Ocean